Tonight's the Night may refer to:

Films
 Tonight's the Night (1932 film), a 1932 British film starring Leslie Fuller
 Tonight's the Night, American title of the 1954 film Happy Ever After, a British comedy starring David Niven
 Tonight's the Night, a 1987 TV movie directed by Bobby Roth

Musicals
To-Night's the Night (musical), a 1914 musical comedy
Tonight's the Night (2003 musical), written by Ben Elton, featuring the music of Rod Stewart

Albums

Tonight's the Night (The Shirelles album), 1961
Tonight's the Night (Neil Young album), 1975
Tonight's the Night...Live, Steeleye Span album, 1992

Songs

"Tonight's the Night", a song from Rock 'n' Roll Stage Show (1956) by Bill Haley & His Comets
"Tonight's the Night" (The Shirelles song), 1960
"Tonight Is the Night", a song recorded by Betty Wright in 1974
"Tonight's the Night" (Neil Young song), 1975, title song from Tonight's the Night
 "Tonight's the Night (Gonna Be Alright)", a 1976 song by Rod Stewart, covered by Janet Jackson
"To-night's the Night", a 1977 song by Brotherhood of Man from the album Images
 "Tonight's The Night (Good Time)", a 1979 single by Kleeer, from the album I Love to Dance
 "Tonight's the Night", a 1980 song by Raydio, from the album Two Places at the Same Time
 "Tonight's the Night", a song by Steeleye Span from Tonight's the Night...Live, released in 1992
 "Tonight's da Night", a single by Redman released in 1993
 "Tonight's the Night" (Blackstreet song), 1995
"Tonight is the Night", a 1995 song by Le Click
 "Tonight's the Night! (You Are Miss USA)", an opening number at Miss USA 1995 pageant
 "Tonite's tha Night", a 1995 song by Kriss Kross from their third album
"Tonight's the Night", a 2003 song by Pink from her album Try This
"Tonight's the Night" (Little Birdy song), 2004
"Tonight's the Night", a 2006 song by Gina G
"Tonight Is the Night" (Outasight song), recorded by Outasight in 2011
 "Tonight's the Night" (Romeo song), 2012
"Tonight is the Night" (McFly song), 2020

Television
 Tonight's the Night (TV series), a 2009 BBC series
 "Tonight's the Night" (Gotham), an episode of Gotham
 "Tonight's the Night", an episode of Grounded for Life
 "Tonight's the Night", an episode of Popular